Oustalet's red colobus (Piliocolobus oustaleti) is a species of red colobus monkey. It lives in various types of forest in southern South Sudan, southern Central African Republic, northern Democratic Republic of the Congo and northeastern Republic of the Congo. It eats leaves, fruit, flowers, buds and possibly seeds.

References

Piliocolobus
Primates of Africa
Mammals described in 1906
Taxa named by Édouard Louis Trouessart
Mammals of South Sudan
Mammals of the Central African Republic
Mammals of the Democratic Republic of the Congo
Mammals of the Republic of the Congo